Bača is a Czech and Slovak surname. Notable people with the surname include:
Jerguš Bača (born 1965), Czechoslovak Slovak ice hockey player
Juraj Bača (born 1977), Slovak canoer
Martin Bača (born 1985), Czech football player
Paun Janković Baća

See also
Robert Baća

Bač (name)
Baca (surname)
Bacca (disambiguation)
Backa (disambiguation)

Czech-language surnames
Slovak-language surnames